Jang Hye-ji (born August 7, 1997) is a South Korean curler. She competed in the 2018 Winter Olympics.
She is also a national representative of mixed double events with Lee Ki-jeong, and is a member of the Gyeongbuk Athletic Association.

Career
She was born in 1997 in Uesung-gun, Gyeongsangbuk-do, and went to the Uiseong Girls' High School, a famous curling high school. Since then she has been a national women's curling team.

In February 2016, she formed Korea's first mixed doubles national team together with Lee Ki-jeong. At the 2016 World Mixed Doubles Curling Championship, the team made it to the round of 16, where they lost. At the 2017 World Mixed Doubles Curling Championship, they finished sixth overall.

Jang played in the mixed doubles tournament at the 2018 Winter Olympics with Lee. She was youngest curler in the tournament. On February 8, she played the Finnish team in the first game of the preliminary round and defeated them 9–4, with Finland conceding after 7 ends. In the second game, they played the Chinese team and after being down 6-1 after four ends, rallied to tie the game, only to lose in an extra end. On February 9, in their third game, they lost 3–8 to Norway, but they beat the US 9–1 in their fourth game. On February 10, in their fifth game, they lost to the Olympic Athletes from Russia, and lost their sixth match against Switzerland. In their seventh and final game, they 7–3 to Canada. They would finish the event in fifth place.

References

External links

1997 births
Living people
Curlers at the 2018 Winter Olympics
South Korean female curlers
Olympic curlers of South Korea
Sportspeople from North Gyeongsang Province
21st-century South Korean women